The 2021–22 season was the 109th season in the existence of Valenciennes FC and the club's eighth consecutive season in the second division of French football. In addition to the domestic league, Valenciennes participated in this season's edition of the Coupe de France.

Players

First-team squad

Out on loan

Transfers

Pre-season and friendlies

Competitions

Overall record

Ligue 2

League table

Results summary

Results by round

Matches
The league fixtures were announced on 25 June 2021.

Coupe de France

References

Valenciennes FC seasons
Valenciennes